Gulha (Dhivehi: ގުޅަ IAST: guḷa IPA) is a typical and popular Maldivian short eat.

Gulha are small ball-shaped dumplings that are stuffed with a mixture of tuna, finely chopped onion, grated coconut, and chili. Depending on the cook, turmeric, lime juice ginger and chopped curry leaves are added to the mixture. Once ready, the gulha are deep-fried.

Gulha can be made with wheat flour or rice flour dough. The rice-flour gulha are usually smaller, harder and more crunchy. The size of gulha may vary from the large ones that are slightly larger than the size of a ping-pong ball to the smallest which are about the size of marbles.
This snack was traditionally eaten with sweetened hot tea and sometimes also together with other short eats.

The fish used traditionally for stuffing gulha was commonly Valhoamas smoked tuna but nowadays many Maldivians use canned tuna. Alternatively, gulha may be oven-baked instead of deep-fried.

See also
Maldivian cuisine
 List of tuna dishes

References

External links
Eating on the Islands - As times have changed, so has the Maldives' unique cuisine and culture
Maldives Wikivoyage

Maldivian cuisine
Tuna dishes
Snack foods
Dumplings
Deep fried foods
Foods containing coconut